Golden Son is a 2015 science fiction novel by American author Pierce Brown, the second in his Red Rising trilogy.

The sequel to 2014's Red Rising, Golden Son continues to follow lowborn Darrow's plan to destroy the Society from within. It debuted at #6 on The New York Times Best Seller list and won the 2015 Goodreads Choice Award for Science Fiction.

Golden Son is followed by the third novel in the series, Morning Star, published in February 2016.

Plot summary

Darrow, now one of the Peerless Scarred and in the service of his enemy, Nero au Augustus, is sent to The Academy, to learn to command fleet of warships in anticipation of being made praetor of a fleet on behalf of Nero. During his final exam at the Academy Darrow faces off against Cassius's older brother, Karnus au Bellona, in a space battle and loses, resulting in hundreds of casualties and being released from the service of Nero, who decides Darrow will be auctioned to another House at the Summit, a gathering of the Great Houses on Luna. Without the protection of Augustus, Darrow is vulnerable to Bellona family whose matriarch has tasked them to murder Darrow in revenge for his murder of her son  and Cassius's brother, Julian.

Awaiting the end of his contract, Darrow is approached by Victra au Julii who leads him to the Jackal, Adrius au Augustus who has since the Institute been exiled by his father and created a media and telecommunications business empire, gaining considerable power and influence which he proposes to use to buy Darrow's contract in order to aid him in bringing down the Sovereign and the Sons of Ares and The Jackal placing himself as the head of the Society. While discussing their plans, a Pink Darrow recognizes as Evey, a former pleasure slave of Mickey the Carver, enters the bar intent on assassinating the Jackal. Before Darrow can stop her, Evey sets off an explosion, and Darrow narrowly manages to save the Jackal.

Darrow learns that Evey is working for Harmony, a leader of the Sons of Ares. Harmony reveals to Darrow that Dancer, his former mentor, has died but that Ares still has a mission for him. The Sons of Ares have planted explosives all over the cities of the Society, and Darrow has been tasked to set off an explosion at the Summit. Darrow is hesitant, but is convinced after Harmony shows a recording of Darrow's wife, Eo, speaking to her sister before she is executed. She asks her sister to hide a cradle from Darrow, revealing her pregnancy. Darrow's anger towards the Society is reignited and he accepts Harmony's assignment.

At the Summit, Darrow prepares to carry out his plans and drugs his close friend, Roque au Fabii, in order to spare his life.  He enters the gathering but at the last moment decides not to set off the bomb. He devises a new plan, the best way to infiltrate the Society is not through violence among the Colors but through civil war among the Golds. Darrow challenges Cassius, who has arrived with Virginia "Mustang" au Augustus to a duel to the death. Cassius, thought to be the better fighter, is bested by Darrow who has been secretly training with Razor Master, Lorn au Arcos. Darrow nearly kills Cassius but is stopped by the Sovereign, Octavia au Lune, revealing her favor for the Bellona family by ending the fight on a technicality. Darrow then defiantly cuts off Cassius's sword arm, causing chaos to erupt and disrupting the Sovereign's plans to wipe out the Augustus family. A massacre ensues and many prominent families are murdered by rival Houses. Darrow narrowly escapes, but is taken into custody by Fitchner, now an Olympic Knight loyal to the Sovereign.

The Sovereign proposes that Darrow enter her service. She tests him by giving him the option of playing a game in which creatures called Oracles measure vital signs while two people ask questions of each other. If the Oracle senses a lie, it injects a deadly venom into the liar. Darrow agrees to play, eventually catches her in a lie about her plans for the Augustans at the gala, while Mustang is present. Fitchner saves the Sovereign from the venom. The Sovereign tries to explain to Mustang and Darrow the reasons for her plans. She laments Augustus' insubordination and states he is to blame for the revolution sparked by executing Eo. She believes if the Arch-Governor of Mars is killed and replaced by the Bellona, there will finally be peace on Mars for all Colors. Afterwards Mustang, angered that the Sovereign plans to murder her father and her entire house, alerts Sevro au Barca, who organizes the Howlers and rescues Darrow and what remains of the Augustus family. They hold the Sovereign's grandson, Lysander, hostage to ensure they leave Luna safely but not before Quinn (a loyal Howler and Roque's lover) is severely wounded by Aja Au Grimmus, the Sovereign's deadliest fury. Before they escape, Darrow is betrayed by Tactus, who frees Lysander and returns him to the Sovereign. The Jackal performs surgery on Quinn, who is in a critical condition.

Now on the run and allied with House Augustus and House Telemanus, Darrow formulates a plan to defeat the Sovereign and the Bellonas who now rule Mars. They attack the largest ship of the Sovereign's armada and incite the Low Colors in the crew to mutiny against the Golds on board. During the chaos, Darrow obtains the service of a Stained Obsidian, Ragnar, and renames the ship The Pax after his late friend. The victory is bittersweet, however, when they return to find that Quinn has died, her death further drives a wedge between Roque and Darrow. Later, Sevro reveals to Darrow that he was contacted by Ares and knows Darrow was born a Red. Darrow, convinced by a message from the still-mysterious Ares and the still-alive Dancer, is overcome with emotion, grateful to share his burden and finally be honest with his close friend.

Later, Darrow meets with Nero's council and establishes that they must obtain more ships in order to defeat the Sovereign. Pliny believes their plans are fruitless and the only way to survive is to run to the farthest reaches of the solar system. Darrow believes he can convince his mentor Lorn to join the fight. He meets with Lorn who refuses to join Darrow, as he says he is now a man of peace and cares only for the safety of his family. Lorn then reveals that the Sovereign arrived before Darrow and provides him with a means of escape. However, Darrow was aware of the Sovereign's plans, telling Lorn that Roque has a host of ships lying in wait. Lorn is then forced to join Darrow as Aja and Tactus arrive with a squad of Praetorians. Darrow injured Aja and killed her team, Aja and Tactus escape. attempting to carry out the Sovereign's orders to kill Lorn's family. Darrow and Lorn pursue him and Darrow appeals to Tactus's trust in Darrow and need for Darrow's approval. After admitting he wants to come back and join him, Tactus lowers his weapon and embraces Darrow, but is killed by Lorn for threatening his family.

When they return to their Fleet, Darrow learns from Mustang that Pliny has betrayed them and under the service of the Sovereign, has captured loyal house members and killed others. Darrow plans a rescue mission and storms Pliny's ship. He convinces the Peerless Scarred who guard Pliny to join him or die. In a gesture of their new shift in obedience, they kill Pliny. Afterwards, the Jackal broadcasts that Darrow has called for an Iron Rain. Houses from all over the solar system flock to join Darrow's cause.

Darrow stages a televised battle against the Sovereign. His army falls in an Iron Rain from the sky onto Mars. Aided by a group of loyal Golds and Greys and Sevro's contact with the Sons of Ares, Darrow invades the capital fortress, but is thwarted when a Brown child acting as a decoy sets off an EMP blast, rendering their armor useless and Darrow's forces are overwhelmed. Darrow manages to cut himself free of his suit and escape with Ragnar and Sevro. Angered, an injured Darrow rushes ahead of his allies and boards the Sovereign's ship in an attempts to assassinate her. Managing to kill Karnus Au Bellona before being subdued by Aja. Fitchner, also on the shuttle, is ordered to execute Darrow, but instead he escapes with Darrow and as Darrow loses consciousness reveals he is Ares. When Darrow awakes from a coma, he meets with Fitchner who reveals why he became Ares and started the revolution. Fitchner explains to Darrow that he fell in love with a Red and met with a Carver who made it possible for his wife to conceive a child with a Gold. She eventually gave birth to Sevro, but The Board of Quality Controls learns of their actions and "disposed of" Fitchner's wife. Angered, Fitchner vowed to bring down the Society and formed the Sons of Ares.

Later, Darrow learns from Mustang that his efforts were not in vain. Roque and his fleet have defeated the Bellonas and the Sovereign, but Cassius and his mother escaped. The Augustus family has taken back Mars and Augustus plans to name Darrow his heir. Harmony has gone rogue, forming her own band of rebels against the Society. She is captured by the Jackal along with Mickey and other Sons. Darrow visits Victra and the Jackal, presenting them each with a gift. Before The Jackal sees his, a squad of Sevro's men, in disguise, storm the Jackal's lair and free the prisoners from The Jackal's grasp. Darrow, now weary of war, and realizing Mustang must know his secret if she is ever to fully trust him, returns home to Lykos. Mustang joins Darrow on his trip and he leads her to his home. He gives her a holotape (a recording of his "carving" into a Gold) and asks for her to watch the tape, and if she understands, to enter his home. After a heartfelt reunion with his mother, Darrow finds that Mustang has disappeared. He ultimately encounters her in a mining tunnel where Mustang angrily confronts him. She is prepared to kill him, but Ragnar intercedes, expressing his deep trust for Darrow and the freedom and purpose Darrow has given him, and Mustang leaves them kneeling in the dust.

Darrow and his companions have a grand victory parade on Mars and Darrow is hailed as a hero. Later, a feast is held in his honor, Roque presents Darrow with a gift in an ivory box. As Roque passes the box to Darrow, he injects him with a tranquilizer and hisses that he is a traitor. Darrow, stunned by his friend's betrayal, realizes too late that the Sovereign has organized a coup. In the ensuing chaos, Lorn is murdered, Victra is shot in the back by her own sister Antonia, and the Jackal captures his father Nero. The Jackal explains to his father that he orchestrated this coup and to illustrate his willingness to do anything for power, confesses that he arranged the death of his older brother, Claudius, the more beloved of Nero's sons. As Nero angrily states he should have smothered the Jackal in his crib, the Jackal calmly shoots him. Cassius arrives, and the box Roque handed to Darrow is revealed to contain the head of Fitchner, stuffed with grapes, an echo of a long ago betrayal by Nero au Augustus of the Bellona family. Cassius tells Darrow that the Sovereign learned of his carving from the Jackal and wishes to dissect him to learn how he became a Gold. Cassius hisses that he will avenge his slain family members, and that the Sovereign and her forces will hunt down and kill all who have opposed her.

Characters
 Darrow, a Red remade into a Gold named "Darrow au Andromedus" to infiltrate and destroy the Society. Nicknamed "The Reaper" at the Institute, he is a lancer of House Augustus.
 Virginia au Augustus, nicknamed "Mustang", daughter of Nero au Augustus and twin sister of Adrius.
 Adrius au Augustus, Virginia's sociopathic twin brother, called "The Jackal".
 Nero au Augustus, the ArchGovernor of Mars and father of Virginia and Adrius.
 Victra au Julii, lancer of House Augustus, half sister to Antonia au Severus.
 Roque au Fabii, lancer of House Augustus.
 Tactus au Rath, lancer of House Augustus.
 Kavax au Telemanus, father of Daxo and the late Pax.
 Daxo au Telemanus, son of Kavax and Pax's brother.
 Cassius au Bellona, lancer of House Bellona, brother of Karnus.
 Karnus au Bellona, lancer of House Bellona, brother of Cassius.
 Octavia au Lune, the Sovereign of the Society.
 Lysander au Lune, grandson and heir of the Sovereign and grandson of Lorn au Arcos.
 Aja au Grimmus, the Sovereign's Protean Knight.
 Lorn au Arcos, the former Rage Knight.
 Fitchner au Barca, former Proctor of Mars at the Institute, father of Sevro.
 Sevro au Barca, leader of the Howlers, son of Fitchner.
 Antonia au Severus-Julii, Darrow's ruthless longtime enemy and Victra's half sister.
 Pliny au Velocitor, Nero's chief of staff.
 Dancer, Red lieutenant in the Sons of Ares.
 Harmony, Dancer's Red lieutenant.
 Mickey, a Violet carver who remade Darrow as a Gold.
 Evey, a Pink former slave of Mickey.

Reception
Golden Son debuted at #6 on The New York Times Best Seller list, and won the 2015 Goodreads Choice Award for Science Fiction. Marc Snetiker of Entertainment Weekly gave the novel an A, calling it "gripping" and noting that "Darrow au Andromedus will break your heart." He added:

Publishers Weekly called the novel "twisty" and noted that hero Darrow "is forced to manipulate both friend and foe, a burden described vividly and to great effect ... Dramatic battles with a real sense of loss, and a final chapter that slams into both Darrow and the reader, make this the rare middle book that loses almost no momentum as it sets up the final installment."

References

External links
 
 
 
 
 

2015 American novels
2015 science fiction novels
American adventure novels
American science fiction novels
Dystopian novels
Classical mythology in popular culture
Novels set on Mars
Novels about slavery
Novels by Pierce Brown
Science fantasy novels
Works about women in war
Del Rey books